Meriam may refer to:

 Someone or something related to Murray Island, Queensland, also called Mer
 Meriam people, the people of Mer
 Meriam language, the language of the Meriam people
 A variant of the female given name Miriam
 Lady Meriam, Chong Ah Mei (died 1935), first wife of the first Prime Minister of Malaysia, Tunku Abdul Rahman
 Lantaka, Javanese bronze breech-loaded swivel-guns
 Mary Meriam (born 1955), American poet and editor
 Francis Jackson Meriam, American abolitionist

See also
 Merriam (disambiguation)
 Merian (disambiguation)